The Little War or Small War was the second of three conflicts between Cuban rebels and Spain. It started on 26 August 1879 and after some minor successes ended in rebel defeat in September 1880. It followed the Ten Years' War of 1868–78 and preceded the final war of 1895–98, which resulted in American intervention and Cuban independence.

Origins
The war had the same origins as the Ten Years' War, and in many ways, it was a continuation of it. Following his release after the Pact of Zanjón, Calixto Garcia travelled to New York City and organized the Cuban Revolutionary Committee with other revolutionaries. In 1878, he issued a manifesto against Spanish rule of Cuba. This met with approval amongst other revolutionary leaders, and war began on August 26, 1879.

The war
The revolution was led by Calixto García, having been one of the few revolutionary leaders who did not sign the Pact of Zanjón. Among the other prominent leaders were José Maceo (the brother of Antonio Maceo), Guillermo Moncada, Emilio Núñez. The revolutionaries faced many problems which were difficult to overcome. They lacked experienced leaders other than García, and they had a dire shortage of weapons and ammunition. Further, they had no foreign allies to help them, and the population was both exhausted from the Ten Years' War and lacked faith in the possibility of victory, desiring peace instead. In the west of the island, most of the revolutionary leaders were arrested. The rest of the leaders were forced to capitulate throughout 1879 and 1880, and by September 1880, the rebels had been completely defeated.

Aftermath
Although the Spanish had made promises of reform, they were ineffective. The Spanish Constitution of 1876 was applied to Cuba in 1881, but this changed little. Although Cuba was able to send representatives to the Cortes Generales, the Spanish parliament, in practice the representatives were among the most conservative in Cuba, and thus little was changed.

The lack of any true reform resulted in another uprising 15 years later, the Cuban War of Independence, which came to be known as the War of '95. The experience gained by the revolutionary generals in the Little War was a great help to them, and following the War of '95 and the linked Spanish–American War, Cuba gained independence from Spain.

See also
 Ten Years' War
 Cuban War of Independence
 José Semidei Rodríguez
 Francisco Gonzalo Marín
 Juan Ríus Rivera

References

Conflicts in 1879
Conflicts in 1880
Rebellions against the Spanish Empire
Spanish colonial period of Cuba
Wars involving Cuba
Wars involving Spain
1879 in Cuba
1880 in Cuba
Spanish American wars of independence
Spanish–American War